Getman Farmhouse is a historic home located at Lyme in Jefferson County, New York. The wood structure, built about 1860, consists of a -story, three-by-two-bay gable-ended front block and a three-by-five-bay anterior wing.

It was listed on the National Register of Historic Places in 1990.

References

Houses on the National Register of Historic Places in New York (state)
Greek Revival houses in New York (state)
Houses completed in 1860
Houses in Jefferson County, New York
National Register of Historic Places in Jefferson County, New York